The United Methodist Church in Great Britain was a Protestant denomination which operated from 1907 to 1932. It was a relatively small grouping of British Methodism, formed in 1907 by the union of the United Methodist Free Churches with two other small groupings, the Bible Christian Church and the Methodist New Connexion.

Formation
The United Methodist Church Act, 1907, the Act of Parliament which enabled this amalgamation, received the royal assent on the 26 July 1907, and authorised the union "to deal with real and personal property belonging to the said three churches or denominations, to provide for the vesting of the said property in trust for the United Church so formed and for the assimilation of the trusts thereof, and for other purposes". The union was completed on the 16 September 1907 in Wesley's Chapel, City Road, London. The Church gave power of speech and vote in its meetings to every member of 18 years of age and upwards. Its principal courts were constituted of an equal number of ministers and laymen.

The Church had theological colleges at Manchester and Sheffield, boys' schools at Shebbear College, Devon and at Harrogate (Ashville College), and a girls' school, Edgehill College at Bideford. It issued a weekly and two monthly journals.

In the Methodist Union of 1932 the United Methodists merged with the Primitive Methodists and the Wesleyan Methodists to form a new church, known simply as the "Methodist Church".

The British United Methodist Church had no particular connection with the United Methodist Church in the United States, other than a common Methodist heritage; the American church did not take the title "United Methodist Church" until 1968.

Further reading
My United Methodists, website provided by the present-day Methodist Church of Great Britain.

References

Methodism in the United Kingdom
Christian organizations established in 1907
Methodist denominations established in the 20th century
Former Methodist denominations
1907 establishments in the United Kingdom